Königslutter am Elm is a town in the district of Helmstedt in Lower Saxony, Germany.

Geography

The town has access to the Brunswick–Magdeburg railway at the Königslutter railway station, served by Regionalbahn trains to Brunswick and Helmstedt, and is traversed by the Bundesstraße 1 federal highway. Königslutter is a stop on the German Timber-Frame Road (Deutsche Fachwerkstraße) tourist route.

In its current form, the township with about 16,000 inhabitants was created in a 1974 administrative reform by joining the following 18 municipalities:

 Beienrode
 Boimstorf
 Bornum am Elm
 Glentorf
 Groß Steinum
 Klein Steimke
 Königslutter
 Lauingen
 Lelm
 Ochsendorf
 Rhode
 Rieseberg
 Rotenkamp
 Rottorf
 Scheppau
 Schickelsheim
 Sunstedt
 Uhry

History

A village called Lûtere in the Duchy of Saxony was first mentioned in an 1135 deed, when Emperor Lothair III established a Benedictine monastery here, centered on the Sts Peter and Paul Church, a prominent Romanesque basilica where he and his consort Richenza of Northeim as well as his son-in-law, the Welf duke Henry the Proud are also buried. The place was named after the nearby karst spring of the Lutter (from Middle High German: lauter, "pure") stream in the Elm hills.

A water castle was erected around 1200 and in 1318 the surrounding settlement was documented as a market town. Around 1400 the Dukes of Brunswick granted the citizens of Luttere town privileges. From the late 14th century onwards, the place was called Konnigesluttere, referring to late Emperor Lothair III, King of the Romans.

Located on the trade route from Brunswick to Magdeburg (the present-day Bundesstraße 1), beer brewing and Elm limestone mining and cutting were its main industries in early modern times, while the monastery developed as a pilgrimage destination. Not until 1924, the monastery complex and the adjacent settlement of Oberlutter were incorporated into the town. The monastery church is known for its sculptural art and the tomb of the emperor.

Politics

Seats in the town's assembly (Rat) as of 2011 local elections:
 Christian Democratic Union (CDU): 15
 Social Democratic Party of Germany (SPD): 14
 Free Voters: 2
 Free Democratic Party (FDP): 1
 Alliance 90/The Greens: 1
In 2013 the assembly has voted to enter in merger negotiations with neighbouring Wolfsburg.

Mayors 
Since November 2011 Alexander Hoppe (SPD) is the mayor of Königslutter. 
Former mayors:

 Walter Lüders (1948–1949)
 Friedrich Schmook (1949–1953)
 Karl Köhler (1953–1954)
 Friedrich Schmook (1954–1956)
 Karl Köhler (1956–1968)
 Otto Schwarzbach (1968–1972)
 Frieda Fricke (1972–1973)
 Gustav Uhde (1973–1974)
 Helmut Albrecht (1974–1976)
 Alfred Küchenthal (1976–1981)
 Helmut Albrecht (1981–1986)
 Alfred Küchenthal (1986–1996)
 Arnulf Baumann (1996–2001)
 Margot Albrecht (2001–2002)
 Ottomar Lippelt (2002–2011)
 Alexander Hoppe (since 2011)

Twin towns

Königslutter is twinned with the following towns:
  Gommern, Germany, since 1990
  Taunton, England, since 1992
  Opalenica, Poland, since 1998

Notable people

 Werner Schrader (1895–1944), teacher, officer and resistance fighter against the Nazi regime
 Samuel Hahnemann (1755–1843), physician and pioneer of homeopathy, who lived in Königslutter from 1796 to 1799
 Thilo Maatsch (1900–1983), Bauhaus artist, spent his retirement here

Notes

External links

 Official site

Helmstedt (district)
Duchy of Brunswick